Fujikura (written: 藤倉) is a Japanese surname. Notable people with the surname include:

, Japanese classical composer
Mitsuo Fujikura, Japanese mixed martial artist
, Japanese shogi player

Japanese-language surnames